Jalmenus inous, the Inous blue or varied hairstreak, is a butterfly of the family Lycaenidae. It is endemic to coastal Western Australia.

The wingspan is about 30 mm.

The larvae feed on a various plants, including Gastrolobium microcarpum, Daviesia divaricata, Daviesia benthamii, Acacia rostellifera and Acacia saligna.

The caterpillars are attended by the ant species Iridomyrmex conifer and  Iridomyrmex rufoniger.

Subspecies
Jalmenus inous bronwynae Johnson & Valentine, 2007 (coastal Western Australia)
Jalmenus inous inous Hewitson, 1865 (south-west coast of Western Australia)
Jalmenus inous notocrucifer Johnson, Hay & Bollam, 1992 (south-west coast of Western Australia)

External links

Australian Insects
Australian Faunal Directory

Theclinae
Butterflies of Australia